A. B. Comstock (April 5, 1857 – November 23, 1937) was a member of the Wisconsin State Assembly.

Comstock was born on April 5, 1857, in Albany, Green County, Wisconsin on a farm that he later owned. After his political career, he operated a gun shop in Albany. He was charged with embezzlement in 1931.

He died in Albany on November 23, 1937.

Political career
Comstock was elected to the Assembly in 1908, where he served on the committees for roads and bridges, and for agriculture. Other positions he held include chairman of the board of trustees of Albany, Green County, Wisconsin and member of the county board of Green County, Wisconsin. Comstock was a Republican.

References

External links

People from Green County, Wisconsin
County supervisors in Wisconsin
Wisconsin city council members
Republican Party members of the Wisconsin State Assembly
Farmers from Wisconsin
1857 births
1937 deaths